The men's C-1 1000 metres competition in canoeing at the 2008 Summer Olympics took place at the Shunyi Olympic Rowing-Canoeing Park in Beijing between August 18 and 22.  The C-1 event is raced in single-man sprint canoes.

Competition consists of three rounds: the heats, the semifinals, and the final. All boats compete in the heats. The top finisher in each of the three heats advances directly to the final, while the next six finishers (places 2 through 7) in each heat move on to the semifinals. The top three finishers in each of the two semifinals join the heats winners in the final.

Heats took place on August 18, semifinals on August 20, and the final on August 22.

Medalists

Schedule
All times are China Standard Time (UTC+8)

Results

Heats
Qualification Rules: 1->Final, 2..7->Semifinals, Rest Out

Heat 1

Heat 2

Heat 3

Semifinals
Qualification Rules: 1..3->Final, Rest Out

Semifinal 1

Semifinal 2

Final

Menkov led for the early part of the race, but was passed at the 750 meter mark by defending Olympic champion Cal and defending world champion Vajda. The Hungarian pulled away in the final 150 meters to win his gold medal which he dedicated to his fallen teammate György Kolonics, who had died a month earlier training for the 2008 Summer Olympics.

References

Sports-reference.com 2008 C-1 1000 m results.
Yahoo! August 18, 2008 sprint heat results. - accessed August 19, 2008.
Yahoo! August 20, 2008 sprint semifinal results. - accessed August 20, 2008.
Yahoo! August 22, 2008 sprint final results. - accessed August 22, 2008.
YouTube.com C-1 1000 m Eurosport final. - accessed 27 October 2009.

Men's C-1 1000
Men's events at the 2008 Summer Olympics